The Primetime Emmy Award for Outstanding Writing for a Drama Series is an award presented annually by the Academy of Television Arts & Sciences (ATAS). It was first awarded at the 7th Primetime Emmy Awards ceremony, held in 1955 and it is given in honor of a writer or writers who produced an outstanding story or screenplay for an episode of a television drama series during the primetime network season. Undergoing several name changes, the award received its current title at the 48th Primetime Emmy Awards in 1996.

Since its inception, the award has been presented to 75 writers. Jesse Armstrong is the current recipient of the award for his work on the episode of HBO's Succession titled "All the Bells Say". Rod Serling holds the record for most wins for this category at six. The Sopranos holds the record for most wins and nominations for this category at 6 and 21, respectively. Game of Thrones, Hill Street Blues and The Sopranos are the only shows that have been nominated in 7 different years.

Winners and nominations
Listed below are the winners of the award for each year, as well as the other nominees.

1950s

1960s

1970s

1980s

1990s

2000s

2010s

2020s

Total awards by network

 CBS – 23
 NBC – 19
 HBO – 11
 ABC – 6
 AMC – 4
 Fox – 3
 Showtime – 2
 DirecTV – 1
 FX – 1 
 Hulu – 1 
 Netflix – 1
 PBS – 1

Individuals with multiple awards

6 awards
 Rod Serling

3 awards
 Jesse Armstrong
 Steven Bochco 
 David Chase
 Tom Fontana
 David Milch 
 Reginald Rose 
 Matthew Weiner 

2 awards
 David Benioff 
 Mitchell Burgess
 Robin Green
 David E. Kelley 
 Ernest Kinoy
 Michael Kozoll 
 Richard Levinson
 William Link
 John Masius
 D. B. Weiss 
 Terence Winter

Individuals with multiple nominations

19 nominations
 Steven Bochco

15 nominations
 David Milch
 Matthew Weiner

11 nominations
 Tom Fontana

10 nominations
 David E. Kelley

9 nominations
 John Masius
 Rod Serling

8 nominations
 David Chase
 Jeff Lewis
 Anthony Yerkovich

7 nominations
 David Benioff
 Robin Green
 D. B. Weiss

6 nominations
 Mitchell Burgess
 Reginald Rose
 Michael I. Wagner
 Terence Winter

5 nominations
 Damon Lindelof
 Aaron Sorkin
 John Tinker

4 nominations
 Carlton Cuse
 William M. Finkelstein
 Michele Gallery
 Karen Hall
 Michael Kozoll
 Peter Morgan
 Thomas Schnauz
 John Wells

3 nominations
 Jesse Armstrong
 Glenn Gordon Caron
 Chris Carter
 Semi Chellas
 Bill Clark
 Charles H. Eglee
 Julian Fellowes
 Joel Fields
 Terry Louise Fisher
 Seth Freeman
 Channing Gibson
 Andre Jacquemetton
 Maria Jacquemetton
 James Lee
 Richard Levinson
 William Link
 Loring Mandel
 Bruce Miller
 Gordon Smith
 Robin Veith
 Joe Weisberg

2 nominations
 J. J. Abrams
 Neal Baer
 Joshua Brand
 James Bridges
 Paddy Chayefsky
 James Costigan
 David Dortort
 Joseph Dougherty
 Matt Duffer
 Ross Duffer
 Morton Fine
 David Friedkin
 Mark Frost
 Vince Gilligan
 Patricia Green
 Walon Green
 Robert Hartung
 Marshall Herskovitz
 Todd A. Kessler
 Michelle King
 Robert King
 Ernest Kinoy
 Ashley Lyle
 Don Mankiewicz
 Abby Mann
 Ted Mann
 John McGreevey
 Jeff Melvoin
 JP Miller
 David Mills
 Chris Mundy
 Bart Nickerson
 Ron Osborn
 Jeff Reno
 Frank Renzulli
 Gene Reynolds
 Alfred Shaughnessy
 John Shiban
 David Simon
 Allan Sloane
 Mark Tinker
 Nicholas Wootton
 John Sacret Young

Programs with multiple awards

6 awards
 The Sopranos (2 consecutive twice)

4 awards
 The Defenders (3 consecutive)

3 awards
 Hill Street Blues (consecutive)
 L.A. Law (2 consecutive)
 Mad Men (consecutive)
 NYPD Blue (2 consecutive)
 Succession (2 consecutive)

2 awards
 CBS Playhouse (consecutive)
 Game of Thrones (consecutive)
 Hallmark Hall of Fame
 Homeland (consecutive)
 Lou Grant (consecutive)
 Playhouse 90 St. Elsewhere thirtysomething (consecutive)
 The Twilight Zone (consecutive)
 The Waltons (consecutive)

Programs with multiple nominations

21 nominations
 The Sopranos16 nominations
 Hill Street Blues15 nominations
 Mad Men12 nominations
 L.A. Law NYPD Blue9 nominations
 Lou Grant Playhouse 90 St. Elsewhere7 nominations
 ER Game of Thrones6 nominations
 Alcoa-Goodyear Playhouse Better Call Saul CBS Playhouse Hallmark Hall of Fame Lost Northern Exposure5 nominations
 thirtysomething The West Wing4 nominations
 The Americans Breaking Bad Columbo The Crown The Defenders The Handmaid's Tale Moonlighting Ozark The Waltons The X-Files3 nominations
 The Adams Chronicles Alfred Hitchcock Presents Bob Hope Presents the Chrysler Theatre Cagney & Lacey Downton Abbey Roots Succession The Twilight Zone Upstairs, Downstairs2 nominations
 The 20th Century Fox Hour Alcoa Premiere Battlestar Galactica Ben Casey Benjamin Franklin The Bold Ones: The Senator China Beach Climax! Friday Night Lights The Good Wife Grey's Anatomy Homeland Homicide: Life on the Street I Spy Killing Eve Kraft Television Theatre The Mandalorian Mission: Impossible Philco Television Playhouse Six Feet Under Stranger Things Studio One Twin Peaks The Wire Yellowjackets''

See also
 Primetime Emmy Award for Outstanding Writing for a Comedy Series

References

Writing for a Drama Series
Screenwriting awards for television